John Schaeffer may refer to:
 
John Schaeffer (art collector) (1941–2020), Australian art collector and businessman 
John Schaeffer (environmentalist) (born 1949), American solar power advocate
John Schaeffer (trainer) (born 1951), American fitness trainer and author
John Nevin Schaeffer (1882–1942), American classicist

See also
John Schaefer, American radio host and author